Isorella is a town and comune in the province of Brescia, in Lombardy, Italy.

References

Cities and towns in Lombardy